The Government Broadband Index (gBBi) is a report compiled by the Economist Intelligence Unit that assesses countries on the basis of government planning, as opposed to current broadband capability. With ambitious targets for both the speed and coverage of next-generation broadband networks, the developed countries of East Asia scored highest in the Economist Intelligence Unit's first government broadband index.

According to the index Greece is the worst-performing country measured, owing to its relatively low coverage target and drawn-out deployment schedule. Greece also suffers due to the considerable size of its public-funding commitment as a percentage of overall government budget revenues, and because its plan does little to foment competition in the high-speed broadband market.

Australia, with the most ambitious targets in the world for both speed and coverage, ranks in the bottom half of the index, because its National Broadband Network (NBN) program is partially funded by the Australian government and the rankings ignore plans to privatize the network in year 9.  South Korea, by comparison, was also a government initiative 15 years ago but has now been privatized, hence its high ranking.

The report 

Besides the actual gBBi, "Full speed ahead: The government broadband index Q1 2011" reviews over 40 national government plans for broadband development, with comparable metrics for more than 30 countries. Specifically, the report addresses the following questions:

 What targets are set for next-generation network (NGN) speed and coverage?
 By when do governments want to see basic broadband services universally available, and what does 'basic' mean in terms of speed?
 How do countries compare in terms of universal and NGN broadband targets?
 How much public funding has been pledged for the attainment of these targets and how do countries compare?
 How are governments acting to facilitate the plans through regulation and by intervening directly in market and network development?
 What role does the private sector play in government plans?
 What is the current status of the plans and of industry involvement in them?

2011 rankings 

The following table summarizes the ranking of the 2011 report. Scoring is on a scale of 0–5, with 5 being the best.

See also 
 List of countries by Internet connection speeds

References

External links 
 Government Broadband Index (gBBi)full report
 Richard Chirgwin's analysis (The Register)
 AUBroadband — Information about various broadband plans and availability of fibre optic broadband in Australia

Technology organizations